Break syndical is the fourth album by Québécois néo-trad band Les Cowboys Fringants.

Track listing
En berne (Pauzé) – 4:08
La tête à Papineau (Pauzé, Lépine) – 4:30
Toune d'automne (Pauzé, Lepine) – 3:34
Heavy metal (Pauzé, Lepine) – 3:40
La manifestation (Pauzé) – 3:21
Break syndical (Lebeau, Lepine) – 2:45
L'hiver approche (Pauzé, Lepine) – 5:23
À' polyvalente (Pauzé) – 1:12
La Noce – 3:56
Quand je r'garde (Lepine) – 1:52
Salut mon Ron (Pauzé) – 4:00
Mon chum Rémi (Pauzé) – 4:05
Joyeux calvaire ! (Pauzé, Lepine) – 3:17
Ruelle laurier (Tremblay) – 4:47 
Hidden track:  (Lebeau)

Members Role
 Karl Tremblay: Lead Singer
 Jean-François "J-F" Pauzé: vocals, guitars, harmonica
 Marie-Annick Lépine: violin, cello, mandolin, accordion, piano, Keyboard/Synthesizer, vocal
 Jérôme Dupras bass guitar, vocal
 Dominique Lebeau: drums, ocarina, xylophone

Guest musicians
 Vincent Gagnon: Trombone (L'hiver approche, La noce), Euphonium (Mon chum rémi)
 Jacynthe Lepon: Trumpet (L'hiver approche, La noce)
 Steve Bergeron: Guitar solo on Heavy Metal

Additional Credits (Booklet)
Recorded between August 2001 and January 2002 at Studio 270 (Outremont)
Realization: Les Cowboys Fringants and Robert Langlois
Musical Arrangement: Each cowboys makes their own arrangements
Sound: Robert Langlois
Mixing: Robert Langlois assisted by Claude Larivée
Mastering: Jim Rabchuck, Audiobec
Graphics: Jo-Anne Bolduc

Special Thanks
 Etienne St-Cyr-Proulx for its guitar and amplifier
 Luc Cabana for his mandolin
 Marc Desjarding for his availability and devotion
 Michel Girard and his wife Marie-Claude

Follows a special note about 'Motel Capri' that helped Les Cowboys Fringants in numerous projects since 1997, noting that Motel Capri, a small business from their native region is not afraid to invest time and money into Quebec culture.

Songfacts

En Berne

A denunciation anthem that proved to be one of the group's biggest hits. It attacks the Québécois political apathy of the present, (regarding the environment and Quebec independence), State gambling and the cynicism of the government regarding poverty. If this is modern Quebec, well I put my flag at half mast, and the clowns that govern us can all get bent; If you're happy with this country (Quebec), well my man that's your opinion, you must be the CEO of some company! (listen)

Toune d'automne

A piece where the singer speaks fondly to a sister that has come back from a trip to English Canada. Singer Karl Tremblay famously likes to make a humorous political statement on stage by replacing the verse Promise me that this time, you're staying home for good by Promise me that you didn't turn into a federalist, little dammit! (listen)

La Manifestation

It comically chronicles a public protest, led by a guy that thought he was Castro, that ends up being a major disappointment and disillusionment. (listen)

L'Hiver Approche

A nice song about a guy saying that winter is coming, and will be hard this year.  He's referring to the tough winters we experience in Quebec.  Notice he also complains about an overconsumption society during almost the whole song saying Santa Claus has just arrived, We're not even in mid-November and other arguments against capitalist society.

Quand je r'garde

A romantic but upbeat song, the only one on this album to have been sung (as main, not backing vocals) by female member Marie-Annick Lépine.

Year-end charts

Notes 

Les Cowboys Fringants albums
2002 albums